Paralimni is a town within the Famagusta District of Cyprus, situated on the island's east coast. Since the Turkish invasion in 1974, it has increased in size and status, primarily due to the migration of refugees fleeing from the north. Many workers in the tourist sectors of Protaras and Ayia Napa live in Paralimni, which is now the temporary administrative centre of the Famagusta District and the biggest municipality of the district under the control of the internationally recognised Republic of Cyprus.

Natural conditions 
The city of Paralimni is located in the extreme southeast of Cyprus island. The city is located 110 kilometers east of the capital Nicosia. The city was traditionally a suburb of Famagusta (until the occupation of the city), just 10 km to the north.

Paralimni is located near the Mediterranean coast, about 80 meters above sea level. The city is located at the southeast end of the island's central plateau Mesaoria. This is why the plain extends around the city in the north and the coastal hills rise to the south.

The city's population in 2001 was 11,091, in 2011 15,000

History
The word Paralimni is Greek and means "by the lake". Historically, the town was built on the shores of a shallow lake which filled with water only in the winter. At the beginning of the 20th century, the whole lakebed was reclaimed for agricultural purposes. Paralimni has not always been where it is now, and was built originally on a hill situated between Deryneia and its present location. In the 15th century, it was moved inland to avoid detection by pirates. It is said that the first people to settle in Paralimni arrived just after the capture of the nearby town of Famagusta by the Ottoman Turks in 1571. The first settlement was called Saint Demetrius, and this place still bears his name today.

In 1986, after a referendum, the area was declared a municipality with the name "Paralimni". In May 1986, the first elections were held for the office of mayor and municipal council; Nikos Vlittis was elected the first mayor, and served from 1986 to 2006. In December 2006, Vlittis lost the election to Andreas Evaggelou, who served as mayor until 2011. The town is a stronghold for the Democratic Rally, a centre-right party whose member and former leader Nicos Anastasiades is the current president of Cyprus. Architecturally, Paralimni has been nondescript, as very little remains of the original village. Outside of the town centre, most houses are little more than small rectangular blocks; this is compensated for by their attractive gardens, especially when the trees are in bloom. Younger generations who earn higher salaries have been spending larger amounts of money on the construction of more modern and attractive houses in the town.

At the heart of Paralimni lies a shopping centre and a small entertainment scene, including modern cafes and bars. Because Paralimni has rapidly grown in size, Cyprus' biggest food retailers such as Carrefour have built or rented branches there. There are also many local supermarkets. The countryside surrounding Paralimni has red soil rich in zinc, which is famous for producing highly nutritious and flavourful potatoes. It is also known for its picturesque windmills, which are used to draw water from underground aquifers to irrigate the surrounding land. Many of these windmills are now derelict, having been replaced by electric or diesel-powered pumps. Before the rise of tourism, the rich agricultural land surrounding Paralimni was the source of its wealth, and is still of great importance today.

Sports
Enosis Neon Paralimni FC, which plays in the Cypriot First Division, is the football team of the town. There is also a Conference team in Paralimni called Anorthosis Paralimniou.

Protaras
Protaras is a predominantly tourist resort which comes under the administrative jurisdiction of Paralimni Municipality.

Climate

Ecology
Paralimni's lake is home to the harmless Cyprus grass snake, which was declared extinct in the 1960s until being rediscovered in 1994. As a result, the lake was designated a Site of Community Interest (SCI).

Notable residents
 Michalis Konstantinou, footballer, born in Paralimni.
 Pelagia Kyriakou, renowned female singer of traditional Cypriot music, born in Paralimni.
 Tasos Markou, EOKA fighter and officer of the Cypriot National Guard and the Hellenic Army - MIA during Turkish invasion of Cyprus.
 Solomos Solomou, raised in Paralimni, killed in 1996 by a Turkish officer in the UN Buffer Zone

Gallery

See also
 Enosis Neon Paralimni FC
 Famagusta District
 Ayia Napa

References

 https://web.archive.org/web/20100131234233/http://www.cyprus-mail.com/cyprus/cyprus-has-failed-protect-grass-snake/20100130

External links

 Paralimni Official Municipality
 Virtual Tour of Protaras

 
Municipalities in Famagusta District